Melč is a municipality and village in Opava District in the Moravian-Silesian Region of the Czech Republic. It has about 600 inhabitants.

History
The first written mention of Melč is from 1377.

Notable people
William Markowitz (1907–1998), American astronomer

Gallery

References

External links

Villages in Opava District